Ooooooweeee!!! was the third album by the singer Dusty Springfield to be released in the USA, issued on the Philips Records label in 1965 and including the hit single "Losing You". Even more so than Springfield's first two US albums, Ooooooweeee!!! can be considered as a compilation since it comprises tracks both from her first British album, A Girl Called Dusty, as well as recordings originally issued on various A- and B-side singles and EPs - recorded and released in the UK over a period of some eighteen months. Ooooooweeee!!! also has tracks from Springfield's September 1964 sessions in New York, produced by Shelby Singleton Jr, some of which remain unreleased in Britain until 1998 and the CD re-issue of the 1965 album, Ev'rything's Coming Up Dusty.

Ooooooweeee!!! was first released on CD by Mercury Records/Universal Music in 1999, with three bonus tracks.

Track listing
Side A
"Losing You" (Tom Springfield, Clive Westlake) - 3:10Recorded in London, 15 July 1964. First release: Philips UK single BF 1369 (A-side), 14 October 1964 
"Here She Comes"  (Joseph Kookoolis, Salvatore Trimachi) - 2:23Recorded in New York, September 1964. First UK release: 1998 CD reissue of 1965 album Ev'rything's Coming Up Dusty 
"Once upon a Time" (Dusty Springfield) - 1:56Recorded in London, 17 October 1963. First release: Philips UK single 40162 (B-side of "I Only Want to Be With You"), 8 November 1963 
"He's Got Something" (Kenny Lynch, Ian Samwell) - 2:37Recorded in London, 12 December 1963. First release: Philips UK EP I Only Want to Be With You, BE 12560, 6 March 1964  
"You Don't Own Me" (John Madara, David White) - 2:29First release: UK album A Girl Called Dusty, April 1964  
"Now That You're My Baby"  (Gerry Goffin, Arthur Kornfeld, Toni Wine) - 2:14Recorded in New York, September 1964. First UK release: Philips UK EP Dusty in New York, BE 12572, 9 April 1965

Side B
"If Wishes Could Be Kisses"  (Roy Alfred, Wes Farrell) - 2:55Recorded in New York, September 1964. First UK release: 1998 CD reissue of 1965 album Ev'rything's Coming Up Dusty  
"I'll Love You for Awhile"  (Gerry Goffin, Carole King) - 2:09Recorded in London, 22 January 1965. First UK release: Philips single BF 1430 (B-side of "Some of Your Lovin'"), 10 September 1965 
"I Wanna Make You Happy"  (Russ Titelman, Cynthia Weil) - 2:29Recorded in New York, September 1964. First UK release: Philips UK EP Dusty in New York, BE 12572, 9 April 1965  
"Your Hurtin' Kinda Love"  (Mike Hawker, Ivor Raymonde) - 2:40Recorded in London, 22 January 1965. First release: Philips UK single BF 1396 (A-side), 5 February 1965  
"When the Lovelight Starts Shining Through His Eyes"  (Lamont Dozier, Brian Holland, Edward Holland, Jr.) - 3:07First release: UK album A Girl Called Dusty, April 1964  
"I Want Your Love Tonight"  (Bob Halley, Carl Spencer) - 2:08Recorded in New York, September 1964. First UK release: Philips UK EP Dusty in New York, BE 12572, 9 April 1965

Bonus tracks 1999 reissue
"Go Ahead On" (Madeline Bell, Dusty Springfield) - 2:38Recorded in London, 26 August 1966. First release: Philips UK single BF 1510 (B-side of "All I See Is You"), 9 September 1966   
"I Will Always Want You" ("Di Fronte All'Amore") (Silvana Simoni, Mario Coppola, Umberto Bindi) - 3:36Recorded in London, 30 June 1966. Originally unissued. First release: UK compilation Something Special, 1996  
"Don't Let Me Lose This Dream" (Aretha Franklin, Ted White) - 2:24First release: UK album Where Am I Going?, 1967

Personnel and production
 Dusty Springfield - lead vocals, backing vocals
 The Breakaways - backing vocals
 Madeline Bell - backing vocals
 Lesley Duncan - backing vocals
 The Echoes - accompaniment
 Johnny Franz - record producer
 Ivor Raymonde - orchestra director
 Alan Tew - orchestra director
 Shelby Singleton Jr. - record producer (New York sessions)
 Ray Stevens - arranger and orchestra director (New York sessions)
 Roger Wake - digital remastering (UK) (1999 re-issue)
 Mike Gill - digital remastering (UK) (1999 re-issue)

References
 Howes, Paul (2001), The Complete Dusty Springfield, London: Reynolds & Hearn Ltd. 

Dusty Springfield albums
1965 albums
Philips Records albums
Albums produced by Johnny Franz